A Minister in the Prime Minister's Office (Sar BeMisrad Rosh HaMemshala) is a minister and member of the Cabinet of Israel appointed by the Prime Minister of Israel to handle various issues on behalf of the Prime Minister.

Current and former posts
Religious Services (after the ministry was closed in 2003, authorities were transferred to the "National Authority for Religious Services". However, it was re-established in 2008, with a minister appointed)
Strategic Affairs (today the Strategic Affairs Ministry)
Regional Development (in the past it was the Development of the Negev and Galilee Ministry)
Arab Sector affairs 
Intelligence Community (today the Intelligence Services Ministry) 
Jerusalem Affairs (until 1992 authorities were under Jerusalem Affairs Ministry)
Israel Broadcasting Authority (closed in 2017)
Improvement of Government Services (Authorities were delegated to Minister and Cabinet Member Michael Eitan, a Minister without portfolio)

All the ministrations aforementioned, which are under the Prime Minister Office responsibilities, are delegated to Ministers without portfolio, who are not part of the Prime Minister's office.

See also
Office of the Prime Minister (Israel)

References 

Prime Ministers, Minister

he:שר במשרד ראש הממשלה